Habartov is a town in Sokolov District in the Karlovy Vary Region of the Czech Republic. It has about 4,700 inhabitants.

Administrative parts
Villages of Horní Částkov, Kluč, Lítov and Úžlabí are administrative parts of Habartov.

Geography
The northern part of the municipal territory with the town proper lies in the southwestern tip of the Ore Mountains, the southern part of Habartov extends into the Sokolov Basin. Half of Medard Lake is situated in Habartov.

History
The first written mention of Habartov is from 1339. The most notable owner of the town was the Nostic family, who held it from 1668 to 1719. Habartov grew thanks to coal mining and mineral processing near the village, and gradually became a town in the 19th century.

Twin towns – sister cities

Habartov is twinned with:
 Bad Berneck, Germany
 Lengenfeld, Germany

References

External links

Cities and towns in the Czech Republic
Populated places in Sokolov District